Trevor Ricardo Nelson, MBE (born 7 January 1964) is an English DJ and presenter.

Early life
Born in the London Borough of Hackney to a family of St Lucian heritage, Nelson attended Central Foundation Boys' Grammar School (now known as Central Foundation Boys' School) in Cowper Street, Islington, London EC2, and Westminster Kingsway College. His first job was in a shoe shop, but his love of music meant a part-time role as a DJ.

Nelson found daytime work at a record importer in 1985, and widened his DJ experience putting on "warehouse parties" at the weekends.

He went on to work in A&R for record labels Cooltempo and EMI, promoting artistes such as D'Angelo, Mica Paris and Lynden David Hall; while also promoting events, including "The Lick".

Radio career
As a pioneer in the urban music scene, Nelson started his broadcasting career as "Madhatter" in 1985 on London's Kiss FM, originally a pirate radio station, and after it gained a licence in 1990. Nelson was both a daytime DJ and director. Behind the decks Nelson cut his teeth as a DJ with Soul II Soul and promoted numerous club nights including Lick. With a stint behind the scenes in A&R at Cooltempo, EMI, Nelson was instrumental in the careers of D’Angelo, Mica Paris and Lynden David Hall. In 1996, Nelson moved to BBC Radio 1 to present the first ever national RNB show The Rhythm Nation and a year later began a Saturday afternoon programme which resulted in his winning a MOBO Award in 1997 as Best DJ.  Nelson stayed at Radio 1 until 2013.

Nelson currently broadcasts across two radio networks. He previously presented weekdays, Monday to Friday 10:00am until 13:00 show on BBC Radio 1Xtra, and he started presenting Rhythm Nation on Saturday evenings on BBC Radio 2 in July 2016, replacing his Wednesday evening soul show.

In November 2016 it was announced that Nelson would be leaving his weekday 10am1pm show on 1Xtra and moving to Saturday and Sundays 47pm, showcasing the best in new and old R&B music, with DJ Ace taking over his slot. He has held this slot since 2011 after leaving the 1Xtra breakfast show which he presented with Gemma Cairney and previously Zena McNally.

In 2010 he was awarded with the special gold lifetime achievement award for his services to broadcasting, at the Sony Radio Academy Awards.

Nelson continues to DJ around the UK and Europe and is now in his tenth summer residency in Global Room nightclub in Pacha, Ibiza.

He has released seven compilation albums, INCredible Sound of Trevor Nelson, The Soul Nation and Lick compilations. His most recent compilation album is The Trevor Nelson Collection. Picking up where his Lick compilations left off, he shares his favourite R&B, Soul and Rap classics from over the decades.

On 21 March 2017 he was a presenter for Sara Cox's Red Nose Day danceathon from 2am to 5am.

In August 2017, April 2018, and again in August 2018, Trevor sat in for Ken Bruce on his Radio 2 show.

On 29 October 2018 it was announced Sara Cox would take over drivetime on Radio 2. As a result, from January 2019 Trevor Nelson's Rhythm Nation would move to Monday-Thursday 22:00–0:00. Trevor will continue with his 1Xtra drivetime show.

In the summer of 2022 Nelson hosted Exodus: Bob Marley Reimagined; the BBC concert took place to mark the 60th anniversary of Jamaican Independence.

Television career
Nelson first appeared on television in 1998 on MTV UK and presenting The Lick on MTV Base off the back of his first RNB show on Radio 1. He featured on the judging panel for Channel 4 programme Chancers  in 2004,  and Just the Two of Us in 2006 and 2007.

Trevor has worked on numerous BBC shows that include: "Holiday:you call the shots" / "Trevor Nelson's Urban Choice" / "The Players club" series and more recently he presented the coverage of the FIFA World Cup concert in South Africa for BBC2 in 2010.

Trevor holds the distinction of being the very first black person to appear on Channel 5, appearing at 10:37pm on The Jack Docherty Show.
Nelson regularly appears as a pundit on programmes where celebrities recall their detailed memories of popular culture. He also provided commentary on the 2012 Summer Olympics Opening Ceremony and 2012 Summer Olympics Closing Ceremony that was widely criticised in the media.

Personal life

A single divorced father of two children and cat owner, Nelson lives in London, and is a fan of Chelsea F.C. He also has a home in Saint Lucia.

He was appointed Member of the Order of the British Empire (MBE) in 2002 for his contribution to the Millennium Volunteers programme.

Outside of Radio programs, Nelson currently owns and promotes his touring club brands including 'Soul Nation' & Classics, which launched at Ministry of Sound.

Bibliography
Sounds Like London: 100 Years of Black Music in the Capital, 2013. (Contributor)

References

External links 

Trevor Nelson's Magnificent 7 (BBC Radio 2)
Trevor Nelson's Rhythm Nation (BBC Radio 2)
Trevor Nelson (BBC Radio 1Xtra)

1964 births
Living people
People from Hackney Central
People educated at Central Foundation Boys' School
English people of Saint Lucian descent
English radio DJs
DJs from London
Members of the Order of the British Empire
Black British DJs
Black British radio presenters
BBC Radio 2 presenters
BBC Radio 1 presenters
BBC Radio 1Xtra presenters